Eucalyptus rupestris, commonly known as Prince Regent gum, is a species of small tree that is endemic to the Kimberley region of Western Australia. It has smooth bark, elliptical to egg-shaped or broadly lance-shaped adult leaves, flower buds in groups of seven, white flowers and cup-shaped to more or less cylindrical fruit.

Description
It has smooth, white to grey bark that is pale orange and powdery when new. Flowering occurs from May to August and the flowers are white.

Taxonomy and naming
Eucalyptus rupestris was first formally described in 1986 by Ian Brooker and Christopher Charles Done from material collected in Prince Regent River Reserve by Alex George in 1974. The specific epithet (rupestris) is a Latin word meaning "rocky", referring to the situation in which this species is usually found.

Distribution and habitat
Prince Regent gum grows in sand on sandstone ridges, including near the Prince Regent River, Mitchell River and Drysdale River National Park in the Kimberley region.

Conservation status
This eucalypt is classified as "not threatened" in Western Australia by the Western Australian Government Department of Parks and Wildlife.

See also
List of Eucalyptus species

References

Eucalypts of Western Australia
Trees of Australia
rupestris
Myrtales of Australia
Taxa named by Ian Brooker
Plants described in 1986